The 1999 Giro d'Italia was the 82nd edition of the Giro. It began on May 15 with a mass-start stage that stretched from Agrigento to Modica. The race came to a close on June 6 with a mass-start stage that ended in the Italian city of Milan. Eighteen teams entered the race that was won by the Italian Ivan Gotti (sub judice )of the  team. Second and third were the Italians riders Paolo Savoldelli and Gilberto Simoni. Marco Pantani is credited with four high mountain stage victories.

Late in the race Marco Pantani was accused of using EPO and was expelled either as the result of a failed doping control, or due to a conspiracy involving drug tests being manipulated.

In the race's other classifications,  rider Chepe González won the mountains classification, Laurent Jalabert of the  team won the points classification, and Team Polti rider Fabrizio Guidi won the intergiro classification.  finished as the winners of the Trofeo Fast Team classification, ranking each of the eighteen teams contesting the race by lowest cumulative time. The other team classification, the Trofeo Super Team classification, where the teams' riders are awarded points for placing within the top twenty in each stage and the points are then totaled for each team was won by Team Polti.

Teams

A total of 18 teams were invited to participate in the 1999 Giro d'Italia. Each team sent a squad of nine riders, so the Giro began with a peloton of 162 cyclists. Out of the 162 riders that started this edition of the Giro d'Italia, a total of 116 riders made it to the finish in Milan.

The 18 teams that took part in the race were:

Route and stages

The route for the 1999 Giro d'Italia was unveiled by race director Carmine Castellano on 14 November 1998 in Milan. It contained four time trial events, there of which were individual and one a team event. There were eleven stages containing high mountains, of which five had summit finishes: stage 5, to Massiccio del Sirino; stage 8, to Gran Sasso d'Italia; stage 15, to Santuario di Oropa; stage 19, to Alpe di Pampeago; and stage 20, to Madonna di Campiglio. The organizers chose to include one rest day. When compared to the previous year's race, the race was  shorter, contained the one more rest day, as well as one more time trial event.

Race overview

Defending champion Marco Pantani, leading the general classification in Madonna di Campiglio (20th stage), was disqualified for an excessive hematocrit level before stage 21. The entire Mercatone Uno–Bianchi (Pantani's team) withdrew from the Giro. This left the race open for Gotti to capture his second overall title and wear the final pink jersey as Giro Champion for the 2nd time in three years.

Classification leadership

Four different jerseys were worn during the 1999 Giro d'Italia. The leader of the general classification – calculated by adding the stage finish times of each rider, and allowing time bonuses for the first three finishers on mass-start stages – wore a pink jersey. This classification is the most important of the race, and its winner is considered as the winner of the Giro.

For the points classification, which awarded a purple (or cyclamen) jersey to its leader, cyclists were given points for finishing a stage in the top 15; additional points could also be won in intermediate sprints. The green jersey was awarded to the mountains classification leader. In this ranking, points were won by reaching the summit of a climb ahead of other cyclists. Each climb was ranked as either first, second or third category, with more points available for higher category climbs. The Cima Coppi, the race's highest point of elevation, awarded more points than the other first category climbs. The Cima Coppi for this Giro was the Passo Sella and was first climbed by the Italian Marco Pantani. The intergiro classification was marked by a blue jersey. The calculation for the intergiro is similar to that of the general classification, in each stage there is a midway point that the riders pass through a point and where their time is stopped. As the race goes on, their times compiled and the person with the lowest time is the leader of the intergiro classification and wears the blue jersey. Although no jersey was awarded, there was also one classification for the teams, in which the stage finish times of the best three cyclists per team were added; the leading team was the one with the lowest total time.

The rows in the following table correspond to the jerseys awarded after that stage was run.

Final standings

General classification

Points classification

Mountains classification

Intergiro classification

Trofeo Fast Team classification

Trofeo Super Team classification

References

Citations

External links 
 Cyclingnews.com: 1999 Giro d'Italia

 
1999
1999 in Italian sport
1999 in road cycling
May 1999 sports events in Europe
June 1999 sports events in Europe